Group B of the 1995 Fed Cup Europe/Africa Zone Group II was one of four pools in the Europe/Africa Zone Group II of the 1995 Fed Cup. Five teams competed in a round robin competition, with the top two teams advancing to the play-offs.

Portugal vs. Senegal

Zimbabwe vs. Estonia

Portugal vs. Luxembourg

Estonia vs. Senegal

Portugal vs. Zimbabwe

Luxembourg vs. Senegal

Portugal vs. Estonia

Luxembourg vs. Zimbabwe

Luxembourg vs. Estonia

Zimbabwe vs. Senegal

See also
Fed Cup structure

References

External links
 Fed Cup website

1995 Fed Cup Europe/Africa Zone